The 1999–2000 Regionalliga was the sixth season of the Regionalliga as the third tier of German football. It was also the last season to be competed in four divisions. Teams were not only competing for promotion to the 2. Bundesliga, but also to qualify for the new two-division Regionalliga.

As in the previous seasons there were four divisions: Nord, Nordost, West/Südwest and Süd. Each division comprised 18 teams, with the exception of the West/Südwest division that had 20.

Nord 
VfL Osnabrück was promoted to 2nd Bundesliga by beating 1. FC Union Berlin in the play-offs.

VfB Lübeck, Eintracht Braunschweig, SV Wilhelmshaven, SV Werder Bremen Amateure and Lüneburger SK qualified for the new two-division Regionalliga.

Final table
The remaining teams were relegated to the Oberliga.

Top scorers

Nordost 
1. FC Union Berlin remains in the Regionalliga, as the club could not secure promotion in the play-off against VfL Osnabrück.

1. FC Union Berlin took part in the play-offs against LR Ahlen and SC Pfullendorf, but could not win promotion.

Dresdner SC, FC Erzgebirge Aue, FC Carl Zeiss Jena, SV Babelsberg 03, FC Sachsen Leipzig and Rot-Weiß Erfurt qualified for the new two-division Regionalliga.

Final table
The remaining teams were relegated to the Oberliga.

Top scorers

West/Südwest 
1. FC Saarbrücken was promoted to the 2nd Bundesliga.

LR Ahlen won promotion to the 2nd Bundesliga by beating 1. FC Union Berlin and SC Pfullendorf in the play-offs.

Teams ranked from 3 to 11 qualified for the new two-division Regionalliga.

The remaining teams were relegated to the Oberliga.

Final table

Top scorers

Süd 
SSV Reutlingen 05 was promoted to the 2. Bundesliga. SC Pfullendorf took part in the play-offs against 1. FC Union Berlin and LR Ahlen, but could not win promotion.

Teams ranked 3 to 13 qualified for the new two-division Regionalliga.

Teams ranked below 13 were relegated to the Oberliga.

FC Augsburg and Karlsruher SC Amateure were forcibly relegated.

Top scorers

Promotion playoffs

Round 1 
The champions of the Regionalliga Nord (VfL Osnabrück) and Regionalliga Nordost (1. FC Union Berlin) faced each other in a two-legged playoff. Osnabrück, as winners, were promoted to the 2. Bundesliga, while Union were given another chance at promotion in round 2.

Round 2 
1. FC Union Berlin faced the runners up of the Regionalliga West/Südwest (LR Ahlen) and Regionalliga Süd (SC Pfullendorf) in a round-robin tournament. Ahlen won this mini-league, and took the final promotion place.

Matches

Standings

Relegation playoffs

Nord
Kickers Emden, champions of the Oberliga Niedersachsen/Bremen, beat TuS Felde, Oberliga Schleswig-Holstein champions in a playoff to face Lüneburger SK, who had finished 6th in the Regionalliga Nord. Lüneburg won 3–1 on aggregate to stay in the Regionalliga.

Nordost
FC Schönberg 95, champions of the NOFV-Oberliga Nord, beat FSV Hoyerswerda, NOFV-Oberliga Süd champions in a playoff to face Rot-Weiß Erfurt, who had finished 7th in the Regionalliga Nordost. Erfurt won 4–2 on aggregate to stay in the Regionalliga.

West/Südwest
SV Elversberg, who had finished twelfth in the Regionalliga West/Südwest, entered a mini-league with VfB Hüls (Oberliga Westfalen champions), Wuppertaler SV (Oberliga Nordrhein champions) and Borussia Neunkirchen (Oberliga Südwest champions) for a place in the Regionalliga. Elversberg won the league with a 100% record.

Süd
No team from the Oberliga Hessen entered qualification, so the champions of the Oberliga Baden-Württemberg (SV Sandhausen) and Bayernliga (Jahn Regensburg) played off in the first round. Regensburg won 5–6 on aggregate, and went on to play FSV Frankfurt, winning 6–3 on aggregate to earn promotion to the Regionalliga Süd.

References

External links 
 Regionalliga Nord 1999/2000 at kicker.de
 Regionalliga Nordost 1999/2000 at kicker.de
 Regionalliga West/Südwest 1999/2000 at kicker.de
 Regionalliga Süd 1999/2000 at kicker.de

Regionalliga seasons
3
Germ